Abdullah Al Huwail (born 16 November 1988) is a Saudi Arabian footballer who plays as a forward.

Career
He formerly played for Al-Arabi, Al-Najma, Najran, Al-Hazem, and Al-Jabalain.

References

External links
 

1988 births
Living people
Saudi Arabian footballers
Association football forwards
Al-Arabi SC (Saudi Arabia) players
Al-Najma SC players
Najran SC players
Al-Hazem F.C. players
Al-Jabalain FC players
Al-Helaliah Club players
Saudi Professional League players
Saudi First Division League players
Saudi Second Division players
Saudi Fourth Division players